Glen Alan Kuiper (born May 20, 1963) is a broadcaster for the Oakland Athletics Major League Baseball team. Kuiper serves as the primary announcer for A's games on NBC Sports California and is also an occasional announcer for the Athletics Radio Network.

Career
A native of Racine, Wisconsin, Glen was drafted out of community college by the Cincinnati Reds in the 10th round (243rd overall) of the 1982 amateur entry draft. He turned it down and continued his education. He later attended University of New Orleans before spending two years as an infielder (primarily at 2B) playing minor league baseball with the Spokane Indians and Erie Cardinals. He moved to the Bay Area in the late 1980s and graduated from San Francisco State University with a bachelor's degree in broadcasting.

Kuiper first started appearing on A's TV broadcasts in 2004 and for the first two years, served as an on-field correspondent and fill-in announcer. He became the primary announcer in 2006. Glen is occasionally the TV play-by-play announcer of A's nationally televised games on Fox. From 1996 until 2000 Kuiper hosted "Giants Lite" and "A's Lite" on SportsChannel Pacific and later FSN Bay Area, which were 30-minute condensed highlight shows of the games, and which gave a synopsis of the games that were not televised.

In addition to baseball, he was a sideline reporter for select NFL telecasts for Fox as well as the San Jose Sharks. Kuiper also handled various collegiate assignments for NBC Sports Bay Area as well as the Golden State Warriors of the NBA.

Trademark calls
 "[Pitcher name] kicks and deals, and we're underway..." for every game's first pitch.
"And that baby's gone!" for an Athletics home run.
"...and that's the ball game." when the final out is recorded.

The latter call is similar to his brother Duane, the play-by-play announcer for the San Francisco Giants.

Personal life
Kuiper is the younger brother of Duane Kuiper, a former Major League player and current broadcaster for the San Francisco Giants. Kuiper resides in Danville, California with his wife, Amanda, and 2 children.

Notes

1963 births
Living people
Major League Baseball broadcasters
Indian Hills Falcons baseball players
Oakland Athletics announcers
People from Racine, Wisconsin
San Francisco State University alumni
University of New Orleans alumni
San Jose Sharks announcers
Golden State Warriors announcers
College football announcers
College basketball announcers in the United States
National Hockey League broadcasters
National Basketball Association broadcasters
National Football League announcers